Tirana Eagles Basket is an Albanian professional basketball team that plays in the Albanian Basketball League.

Players

Current roster

References

Basketball teams in Albania
Sport in Tirana
Basketball teams established in 2014